The following are the national records in athletics in Sudan maintained by Sudan Athletic Association (SAA).

Outdoor

Key to tables:

h = hand timing

A = affected by altitude

X = annulled due to doping violation

Men

Women

Indoor

Men

Women

Notes

References

External links

Sudan
Records
Athletics